Spartanburg County School District One is a school district based in Campobello, South Carolina, U.S. It serves much of western Spartanburg County, including Campobello, Inman, and Landrum. Spartanburg County School District One has eleven schools.  That includes six elementary, two middle school, two high schools, and one career center.

List of schools

Elementary schools
 Campobello-Gramling
 New Prospect Elementary
 O.P. Earle Elementary
 Holly Springs-Motlow Elementary
 Inman Elementary
 Inman Intermediate

Middle schools
 Landrum Middle
 Mabry Middle

High school
 Chapman High
 Landrum High School

Career Center
 Swofford Career Center

Other
 Virtual School
 The Scholars Academy

References 

School districts in South Carolina
Education in Spartanburg County, South Carolina